Joseph Lown Spence (13 October 1925 – December 2009) was an English footballer who played as a central defender in the Football League for York City.

Career
A former England Schools' player, and son of Manchester United and England player Joe Spence, Spence started his football career with Chesterfield in January 1947. He moved to Buxton in July 1949, after not making a single appearance at Chesterfield. Spence moved on to York City in July 1950. He was a virtual ever-present at the club during the 1951–52 and 1952–53 seasons. He left the club in the summer of 1954 to move to Burton Albion.

Notes

1925 births
2009 deaths
Footballers from Salford
English footballers
Association football central defenders
Chesterfield F.C. players
Buxton F.C. players
York City F.C. players
Burton Albion F.C. players
English Football League players